The Municipality of Duplek is a small municipality in northeastern Slovenia. Its seat is Spodnji Duplek. The municipality lies on the left bank of the Drava River on the northwestern edge of the Slovene Hills, about 10 km southeast of Maribor. The area is part of the traditional region of Styria. It is now included in the Drava Statistical Region.

Settlements
In addition to the municipal seat of Spodnji Duplek, the municipality also includes the following settlements:

 Ciglence
 Dvorjane
 Jablance
 Spodnja Korena
 Vurberk
 Zgornja Korena
 Zgornji Duplek
 Žikarce
 Zimica

References

External links
 
 Municipality of Duplek on Geopedia
 Duplek municipal site

Duplek